Coleophora affiliatella is a moth of the family Coleophoridae. It is found in Canada, including Nova Scotia.

The larvae feed on the leaves of Ledum and Rhododendron species. They create a spatulate leaf case.

References

affiliatella
Moths of North America
Moths described in 1945